Progesterone (P4) is an endogenous steroid and progestogen sex hormone involved in the menstrual cycle, pregnancy, and embryogenesis of humans and other species. It belongs to a group of steroid hormones called the progestogens and is the major progestogen in the body. Progesterone has a variety of important functions in the body. It is also a crucial metabolic intermediate in the production of other endogenous steroids, including the sex hormones and the corticosteroids, and plays an important role in brain function as a neurosteroid.

In addition to its role as a natural hormone, progesterone is also used as a medication, such as in combination with estrogen for contraception, to reduce the risk of uterine or cervical cancer, in hormone replacement therapy, and in feminizing hormone therapy. It was first prescribed in 1934.

Biological activity

Progesterone is the most important progestogen in the body. As a potent agonist of the nuclear progesterone receptor (nPR) (with an affinity of KD = 1 nM) the resulting effects on ribosomal transcription plays a major role in regulation of female reproduction. In addition, progesterone is an agonist of the more recently discovered membrane progesterone receptors (mPRs), of which the expression has regulation effects in reproduction function (oocyte maturation, labor, and sperm motility) and cancer although additional research is required to further define the roles. It also functions as a ligand of the PGRMC1 (progesterone receptor membrane component 1) which impacts tumor progression, metabolic regulation, and viability control of nerve cells. Moreover, progesterone is also known to be an antagonist of the sigma σ1 receptor, a negative allosteric modulator of nicotinic acetylcholine receptors, and a potent antagonist of the mineralocorticoid receptor (MR). Progesterone prevents MR activation by binding to this receptor with an affinity exceeding even those of aldosterone and glucocorticoids such as cortisol and corticosterone, and produces antimineralocorticoid effects, such as natriuresis, at physiological concentrations. In addition, progesterone binds to and behaves as a partial agonist of the glucocorticoid receptor (GR), albeit with very low potency (EC50 >100-fold less relative to cortisol).

Progesterone, through its neurosteroid active metabolites such as 5α-dihydroprogesterone and allopregnanolone, acts indirectly as a positive allosteric modulator of the GABAA receptor.

Progesterone and some of its metabolites, such as 5β-dihydroprogesterone, are agonists of the pregnane X receptor (PXR), albeit weakly so (EC50 >10 μM). In accordance, progesterone induces several hepatic cytochrome P450 enzymes, such as CYP3A4, especially during pregnancy when concentrations are much higher than usual. Perimenopausal women have been found to have greater CYP3A4 activity relative to men and postmenopausal women, and it has been inferred that this may be due to the higher progesterone levels present in perimenopausal women.

Progesterone modulates the activity of CatSper (cation channels of sperm) voltage-gated Ca2+ channels. Since eggs release progesterone, sperm may use progesterone as a homing signal to swim toward eggs (chemotaxis). As a result, it has been suggested that substances that block the progesterone binding site on CatSper channels could potentially be used in male contraception.

Biological function

Hormonal interactions
Progesterone has a number of physiological effects that are amplified in the presence of estrogens. Estrogens through estrogen receptors (ERs) induce or upregulate the expression of the PR. One example of this is in breast tissue, where estrogens allow progesterone to mediate lobuloalveolar development.

Elevated levels of progesterone potently reduce the sodium-retaining activity of aldosterone, resulting in natriuresis and a reduction in extracellular fluid volume. Progesterone withdrawal, on the other hand, is associated with a temporary increase in sodium retention (reduced natriuresis, with an increase in extracellular fluid volume) due to the compensatory increase in aldosterone production, which combats the blockade of the mineralocorticoid receptor by the previously elevated level of progesterone.

Reproductive system

Progesterone has key effects via non-genomic signalling on human sperm as they migrate through the female tract before fertilization occurs, though the receptor(s) as yet remain unidentified. Detailed characterisation of the events occurring in sperm in response to progesterone has elucidated certain events including intracellular calcium transients and maintained changes, slow calcium oscillations, now thought to possibly regulate motility. It is produced by the ovaries. Progesterone has also been shown to demonstrate effects on octopus spermatozoa.

Progesterone is sometimes called the "hormone of pregnancy", and it has many roles relating to the development of the fetus:
 Progesterone converts the endometrium to its secretory stage to prepare the uterus for implantation. At the same time progesterone affects the vaginal epithelium and cervical mucus, making it thick and impenetrable to sperm. Progesterone is anti-mitogenic in endometrial epithelial cells, and as such, mitigates the tropic effects of estrogen. If pregnancy does not occur, progesterone levels will decrease, leading to menstruation. Normal menstrual bleeding is progesterone-withdrawal bleeding. If ovulation does not occur and the corpus luteum does not develop, levels of progesterone may be low, leading to anovulatory dysfunctional uterine bleeding.
 During implantation and gestation, progesterone appears to decrease the maternal immune response to allow for the acceptance of the pregnancy.
 Progesterone decreases contractility of the uterine smooth muscle. This effect contributes to prevention of preterm labor.
 A drop in progesterone levels is possibly one step that facilitates the onset of labor.
 In addition, progesterone inhibits lactation during pregnancy. The fall in progesterone levels following delivery is one of the triggers for milk production.

The fetus metabolizes placental progesterone in the production of adrenal steroids.

Breasts

Lobuloalveolar development
Progesterone plays an important role in breast development in women. In conjunction with prolactin, it mediates lobuloalveolar maturation of the mammary glands during pregnancy to allow for milk production and thus lactation and breastfeeding of offspring following parturition (childbirth). Estrogen induces expression of the PR in breast tissue and hence progesterone is dependent on estrogen to mediate lobuloalveolar development. It has been found that  is a critical downstream mediator of progesterone-induced lobuloalveolar maturation. RANKL knockout mice show an almost identical mammary phenotype to PR knockout mice, including normal mammary ductal development but complete failure of the development of lobuloalveolar structures.

Ductal development
Though to a far lesser extent than estrogen, which is the major mediator of mammary ductal development (via the ERα), progesterone may be involved in ductal development of the mammary glands to some extent as well. PR knockout mice or mice treated with the PR antagonist mifepristone show delayed although otherwise normal mammary ductal development at puberty. In addition, mice modified to have overexpression of PRA display ductal hyperplasia, and progesterone induces ductal growth in the mouse mammary gland. Progesterone mediates ductal development mainly via induction of the expression of amphiregulin, the same growth factor that estrogen primarily induces the expression of to mediate ductal development. These animal findings suggest that, while not essential for full mammary ductal development, progesterone seems to play a potentiating or accelerating role in estrogen-mediated mammary ductal development.

Breast cancer risk
Progesterone also appears to be involved in the pathophysiology of breast cancer, though its role, and whether it is a promoter or inhibitor of breast cancer risk, has not been fully elucidated. Most progestins, or synthetic progestogens, like medroxyprogesterone acetate, have been found to increase the risk of breast cancer in postmenopausal women in combination with estrogen as a component of menopausal hormone therapy. The combination of natural oral progesterone or the atypical progestin dydrogesterone with estrogen has been associated with less risk of breast cancer than progestins plus estrogen. However, this may simply be an artifact of the low progesterone levels produced with oral progesterone. More research is needed on the role of progesterone in breast cancer.

Skin health
The estrogen receptor, as well as the progesterone receptor, have been detected in the skin, including in keratinocytes and fibroblasts. At menopause and thereafter, decreased levels of female sex hormones result in atrophy, thinning, and increased wrinkling of the skin and a reduction in skin elasticity, firmness, and strength. These skin changes constitute an acceleration in skin aging and are the result of decreased collagen content, irregularities in the morphology of epidermal skin cells, decreased ground substance between skin fibers, and reduced capillaries and blood flow. The skin also becomes more dry during menopause, which is due to reduced skin hydration and surface lipids (sebum production). Along with chronological aging and photoaging, estrogen deficiency in menopause is one of the three main factors that predominantly influences skin aging.

Hormone replacement therapy, consisting of systemic treatment with estrogen alone or in combination with a progestogen, has well-documented and considerable beneficial effects on the skin of postmenopausal women. These benefits include increased skin collagen content, skin thickness and elasticity, and skin hydration and surface lipids. Topical estrogen has been found to have similar beneficial effects on the skin. In addition, a study has found that topical 2% progesterone cream significantly increases skin elasticity and firmness and observably decreases wrinkles in peri- and postmenopausal women. Skin hydration and surface lipids, on the other hand, did not significantly change with topical progesterone. These findings suggest that progesterone, like estrogen, also has beneficial effects on the skin, and may be independently protective against skin aging.

Sexuality

Libido

Progesterone and its neurosteroid active metabolite allopregnanolone appear to be importantly involved in libido in females.

Homosexuality
Dr. Diana Fleischman, of the University of Portsmouth, and colleagues looked for a relationship between progesterone and sexual attitudes in 92 women. Their research, published in the Archives of Sexual Behavior found that women who had higher levels of progesterone scored higher on a questionnaire measuring homoerotic motivation. They also found that men who had high levels of progesterone were more likely to have higher homoerotic motivation scores after affiliative priming compared to men with low levels of progesterone.

Nervous system
Progesterone, like pregnenolone and dehydroepiandrosterone (DHEA), belongs to an important group of endogenous steroids called neurosteroids. It can be metabolized within all parts of the central nervous system.

Neurosteroids are neuromodulators, and are neuroprotective, neurogenic, and regulate neurotransmission and myelination. The effects of progesterone as a neurosteroid are mediated predominantly through its interactions with non-nuclear PRs, namely the mPRs and PGRMC1, as well as certain other receptors, such as the σ1 and nACh receptors.

Brain damage

Previous studies have shown that progesterone supports the normal development of neurons in the brain, and that the hormone has a protective effect on damaged brain tissue. It has been observed in animal models that females have reduced susceptibility to traumatic brain injury and this protective effect has been hypothesized to be caused by increased circulating levels of estrogen and progesterone in females.

Proposed mechanism
The mechanism of progesterone protective effects may be the reduction of inflammation that follows brain trauma and hemorrhage.

Damage incurred by traumatic brain injury is believed to be caused in part by mass depolarization leading to excitotoxicity. One way in which progesterone helps to alleviate some of this excitotoxicity is by blocking the voltage-dependent calcium channels that trigger neurotransmitter release. It does so by manipulating the signaling pathways of transcription factors involved in this release. Another method for reducing the excitotoxicity is by up-regulating the GABAA, a widespread inhibitory neurotransmitter receptor.

Progesterone has also been shown to prevent apoptosis in neurons, a common consequence of brain injury. It does so by inhibiting enzymes involved in the apoptosis pathway specifically concerning the mitochondria, such as activated caspase 3 and cytochrome c.

Not only does progesterone help prevent further damage, it has also been shown to aid in neuroregeneration. One of the serious effects of traumatic brain injury includes edema. Animal studies show that progesterone treatment leads to a decrease in edema levels by increasing the concentration of macrophages and microglia sent to the injured tissue. This was observed in the form of reduced leakage from the blood brain barrier in secondary recovery in progesterone treated rats. In addition, progesterone was observed to have antioxidant properties, reducing the concentration of oxygen free radicals faster than without. There is also evidence that the addition of progesterone can also help remyelinate damaged axons due to trauma, restoring some lost neural signal conduction. Another way progesterone aids in regeneration includes increasing the circulation of endothelial progenitor cells in the brain. This helps new vasculature to grow around scar tissue which helps repair the area of insult.

Addiction

Progesterone enhances the function of serotonin receptors in the brain, so an excess or deficit of progesterone has the potential to result in significant neurochemical issues. This provides an explanation for why some people resort to substances that enhance serotonin activity such as nicotine, alcohol, and cannabis when their progesterone levels fall below optimal levels.
 Sex differences in hormone levels may induce women to respond differently than men to nicotine. When women undergo cyclic changes or different hormonal transition phases (menopause, pregnancy, adolescence), there are changes in their progesterone levels. Therefore, females have an increased biological vulnerability to nicotine's reinforcing effects compared to males and progesterone may be used to counter this enhanced vulnerability. This information supports the idea that progesterone can affect behavior.
 Similar to nicotine, cocaine also increases the release of dopamine in the brain. The neurotransmitter is involved in the reward center and is one of the main neurotransmitters involved with substance abuse and reliance. In a study of cocaine users, it was reported that progesterone reduced craving and the feeling of being stimulated by cocaine. Thus, progesterone was suggested as an agent that decreases cocaine craving by reducing the dopaminergic properties of the drug.

Societal
In a 2012 University of Amsterdam study of 120 women, women's luteal phase (higher levels of progesterone, and increasing levels of estrogen) was correlated with lower level of competitive behavior in gambling and math contest scenarios, while their premenstrual phase (sharply-decreasing levels of progesterone, and decreasing levels of estrogen) was correlated with a higher level of competitive behavior.

Other effects
 Progesterone also has a role in skin elasticity and bone strength, in respiration, in nerve tissue and in female sexuality, and the presence of progesterone receptors in certain muscle and fat tissue may hint at a role in sexually dimorphic proportions of those.
 During pregnancy, progesterone is said to decrease uterine irritability.
 During pregnancy, progesterone helps to suppress immune responses of the mother to fetal antigens, which prevents rejection of the fetus.
 Progesterone raises epidermal growth factor-1 (EGF-1) levels, a factor often used to induce proliferation, and used to sustain cultures, of stem cells.
 Progesterone increases core temperature (thermogenic function) during ovulation.
 Progesterone reduces spasm and relaxes smooth muscle. Bronchi are widened and mucus regulated. (PRs are widely present in submucosal tissue.)
 Progesterone acts as an antiinflammatory agent and regulates the immune response.
 Progesterone reduces gall-bladder activity.
 Progesterone normalizes blood clotting and vascular tone, zinc and copper levels, cell oxygen levels, and use of fat stores for energy.
 Progesterone may affect gum health, increasing risk of gingivitis (gum inflammation).
 Progesterone appears to prevent endometrial cancer (involving the uterine lining) by regulating the effects of estrogen.
 Progesterone plays an important role in the signaling of insulin release and pancreatic function, and may affect the susceptibility to diabetes or gestational diabetes.

Biochemistry

Biosynthesis

In mammals, progesterone, like all other steroid hormones, is synthesized from pregnenolone, which itself is derived from cholesterol.

Cholesterol undergoes double oxidation to produce 22R-hydroxycholesterol and then 20α,22R-dihydroxycholesterol. This vicinal diol is then further oxidized with loss of the side chain starting at position C22 to produce pregnenolone. This reaction is catalyzed by cytochrome P450scc.

The conversion of pregnenolone to progesterone takes place in two steps. First, the 3β-hydroxyl group is oxidized to a keto group and second, the double bond is moved to C4, from C5 through a keto/enol tautomerization reaction. This reaction is catalyzed by 3β-hydroxysteroid dehydrogenase/δ5-4-isomerase.

Progesterone in turn is the precursor of the mineralocorticoid aldosterone, and after conversion to 17α-hydroxyprogesterone, of cortisol and androstenedione. Androstenedione can be converted to testosterone, estrone, and estradiol, highlighting the critical role of progesterone in testosterone synthesis.

Pregnenolone and progesterone can also be synthesized by yeast.

Approximately 25 mg of progesterone is secreted from the ovaries per day in women, while the adrenal glands produce about 2 mg of progesterone per day.

Distribution
Progesterone binds extensively to plasma proteins, including albumin (50–54%) and transcortin (43–48%). It has similar affinity for albumin relative to the PR.

Metabolism
The metabolism of progesterone is rapid and extensive and occurs mainly in the liver, though enzymes that metabolize progesterone are also expressed widely in the brain, skin, and various other extrahepatic tissues. Progesterone has an elimination half-life of only approximately 5 minutes in circulation. The metabolism of progesterone is complex, and it may form as many as 35 different unconjugated metabolites when it is ingested orally. Progesterone is highly susceptible to enzymatic reduction via reductases and hydroxysteroid dehydrogenases due to its double bond (between the C4 and C5 positions) and its two ketones (at the C3 and C20 positions).

The major metabolic pathway of progesterone is reduction by 5α-reductase and 5β-reductase into the dihydrogenated 5α-dihydroprogesterone and 5β-dihydroprogesterone, respectively. This is followed by the further reduction of these metabolites via 3α-hydroxysteroid dehydrogenase and 3β-hydroxysteroid dehydrogenase into the tetrahydrogenated allopregnanolone, pregnanolone, isopregnanolone, and epipregnanolone. Subsequently, 20α-hydroxysteroid dehydrogenase and 20β-hydroxysteroid dehydrogenase reduce these metabolites to form the corresponding hexahydrogenated pregnanediols (eight different isomers in total), which are then conjugated via glucuronidation and/or sulfation, released from the liver into circulation, and excreted by the kidneys into the urine. The major metabolite of progesterone in the urine is the 3α,5β,20α isomer of pregnanediol glucuronide, which has been found to constitute 15 to 30% of an injection of progesterone. Other metabolites of progesterone formed by the enzymes in this pathway include 3α-dihydroprogesterone, 3β-dihydroprogesterone, 20α-dihydroprogesterone, and 20β-dihydroprogesterone, as well as various combination products of the enzymes aside from those already mentioned. Progesterone can also first be hydroxylated (see below) and then reduced. Endogenous progesterone is metabolized approximately 50% into 5α-dihydroprogesterone in the corpus luteum, 35% into 3β-dihydroprogesterone in the liver, and 10% into 20α-dihydroprogesterone.

Relatively small portions of progesterone are hydroxylated via 17α-hydroxylase (CYP17A1) and 21-hydroxylase (CYP21A2) into 17α-hydroxyprogesterone and 11-deoxycorticosterone (21-hydroxyprogesterone), respectively, and pregnanetriols are formed secondarily to 17α-hydroxylation. Even smaller amounts of progesterone may be also hydroxylated via 11β-hydroxylase (CYP11B1) and to a lesser extent via aldosterone synthase (CYP11B2) into 11β-hydroxyprogesterone. In addition, progesterone can be hydroxylated in the liver by other cytochrome P450 enzymes which are not steroid-specific. 6β-Hydroxylation, which is catalyzed mainly by CYP3A4, is the major transformation, and is responsible for approximately 70% of cytochrome P450-mediated progesterone metabolism. Other routes include 6α-, 16α-, and 16β-hydroxylation. However, treatment of women with ketoconazole, a strong CYP3A4 inhibitor, had minimal effects on progesterone levels, producing only a slight and non-significant increase, and this suggests that cytochrome P450 enzymes play only a small role in progesterone metabolism.

Levels

In women, progesterone levels are relatively low during the preovulatory phase of the menstrual cycle, rise after ovulation, and are elevated during the luteal phase, as shown in the diagram above. Progesterone levels tend to be less than 2 ng/mL prior to ovulation and greater than 5 ng/mL after ovulation. If pregnancy occurs, human chorionic gonadotropin is released, maintaining the corpus luteum and allowing it to maintain levels of progesterone. Between 7 and 9 weeks, the placenta begins to produce progesterone in place of the corpus luteum in a process called the luteal-placental shift.

After the luteal-placental shift, progesterone levels start to rise further and may reach 100 to 200 ng/mL at term. Whether a decrease in progesterone levels is critical for the initiation of labor has been argued and may be species-specific. After delivery of the placenta and during lactation, progesterone levels are very low.

Progesterone levels are low in children and postmenopausal women. Adult males have levels similar to those in women during the follicular phase of the menstrual cycle.

Ranges
Blood test results should always be interpreted using the reference ranges provided by the laboratory that performed the results. Example reference ranges are listed below.

Sources

Animal
Progesterone is produced in high amounts in the ovaries (by the corpus luteum) from the onset of puberty to menopause, and is also produced in smaller amounts by the adrenal glands after the onset of adrenarche in both males and females. To a lesser extent, progesterone is produced in nervous tissue, especially in the brain, and in adipose (fat) tissue, as well.

During human pregnancy, progesterone is produced in increasingly high amounts by the ovaries and placenta. At first, the source is the corpus luteum that has been "rescued" by the presence of human chorionic gonadotropin (hCG) from the conceptus. However, after the 8th week, production of progesterone shifts to the placenta. The placenta utilizes maternal cholesterol as the initial substrate, and most of the produced progesterone enters the maternal circulation, but some is picked up by the fetal circulation and used as substrate for fetal corticosteroids. At term the placenta produces about 250 mg progesterone per day.

An additional animal source of progesterone is milk products. After consumption of milk products the level of bioavailable progesterone goes up.

Plants
In at least one plant, Juglans regia, progesterone has been detected. In addition, progesterone-like steroids are found in Dioscorea mexicana. Dioscorea mexicana is a plant that is part of the yam family native to Mexico. It contains a steroid called diosgenin that is taken from the plant and is converted into progesterone. Diosgenin and progesterone are also found in other Dioscorea species, as well as in other plants that are not closely related, such as fenugreek.

Another plant that contains substances readily convertible to progesterone is Dioscorea pseudojaponica native to Taiwan. Research has shown that the Taiwanese yam contains saponins — steroids that can be converted to diosgenin and thence to progesterone.

Many other Dioscorea species of the yam family contain steroidal substances from which progesterone can be produced. Among the more notable of these are Dioscorea villosa and Dioscorea polygonoides. One study showed that the Dioscorea villosa contains 3.5% diosgenin. Dioscorea polygonoides has been found to contain 2.64% diosgenin as shown by gas chromatography-mass spectrometry. Many of the Dioscorea species that originate from the yam family grow in countries that have tropical and subtropical climates.

Medical use

Progesterone is used as a medication. It is used in combination with estrogens mainly in hormone therapy for menopausal symptoms and low sex hormone levels in women. It is also used in women to support pregnancy and fertility and to treat gynecological disorders. Progesterone has been shown to  prevent miscarriage in women with 1) vaginal bleeding early in their current pregnancy and 2) a previous history of miscarriage. Progesterone can be taken by mouth, through the vagina, and by injection into muscle or fat, among other routes.

Chemistry

Progesterone is a naturally occurring pregnane steroid and is also known as pregn-4-ene-3,20-dione. It has a double bond (4-ene) between the C4 and C5 positions and two ketone groups (3,20-dione), one at the C3 position and the other at the C20 position.

Synthesis
Progesterone is commercially produced by semisynthesis. Two main routes are used: one from yam diosgenin first pioneered by Marker in 1940, and one based on soy phytosterols scaled up in the 1970s.  Additional (not necessarily economical) semisyntheses of progesterone have also been reported starting from a variety of steroids. For the example, cortisone can be simultaneously deoxygenated at the C-17 and C-21 position by treatment with iodotrimethylsilane in chloroform to produce 11-keto-progesterone (ketogestin), which in turn can be reduced at position-11 to yield progesterone.

Marker semisynthesis

An economical semisynthesis of progesterone from the plant steroid diosgenin isolated from yams was developed by Russell Marker in 1940 for the Parke-Davis pharmaceutical company. This synthesis is known as the Marker degradation.

The 16-DPA intermediate is important to the synthesis of many other medically important steroids. A very similar approach can produce 16-DPA from solanine.

Soy semisynthesis
Progesterone can also be made from the stigmasterol found in soybean oil also. c.f. Percy Julian.

Total synthesis

A total synthesis of progesterone was reported in 1971 by W.S. Johnson. The synthesis begins with reacting the phosphonium salt 7 with phenyl lithium to produce the phosphonium ylide 8. The ylide 8 is reacted with an aldehyde to produce the alkene 9. The ketal protecting groups of 9 are hydrolyzed to produce the diketone 10, which in turn is cyclized to form the cyclopentenone 11. The ketone of 11 is reacted with methyl lithium to yield the tertiary alcohol 12, which in turn is treated with acid to produce the tertiary cation 13. The key step of the synthesis is the π-cation cyclization of 13 in which the B-, C-, and D-rings of the steroid are simultaneously formed to produce 14. This step resembles the cationic cyclization reaction used in the biosynthesis of steroids and hence is referred to as biomimetic. In the next step the enol orthoester is hydrolyzed to produce the ketone 15. The cyclopentene A-ring is then opened by oxidizing with ozone to produce 16. Finally, the diketone 17 undergoes an intramolecular aldol condensation by treating with aqueous potassium hydroxide to produce progesterone.

History
George W. Corner and Willard M. Allen discovered the hormonal action of progesterone in 1929. By 1931–1932, nearly pure crystalline material of high progestational activity had been isolated from the corpus luteum of animals, and by 1934, pure crystalline progesterone had been refined and obtained and the chemical structure of progesterone was determined. This was achieved by Adolf Butenandt at the Chemisches Institut of Technical University in Danzig, who extracted this new compound from several thousand liters of urine.

Chemical synthesis of progesterone from stigmasterol and pregnanediol was accomplished later that year. Up to this point, progesterone, known generically as corpus luteum hormone, had been being referred to by several groups by different names, including corporin, lutein, luteosterone, and progestin. In 1935, at the time of the Second International Conference on the Standardization of Sex Hormones in London, England, a compromise was made between the groups and the name progesterone (progestational steroidal ketone) was created.

Veterinary use
The use of progesterone tests in dog breeding to pinpoint ovulation is becoming more widely used.  There are several tests available but the most reliable test is a blood test with blood drawn by a veterinarian and sent to a lab for processing.  Results can usually be obtained with 24 to 72 hours.  The rationale for using progesterone tests is that increased numbers begin in close proximity to preovulatory surge in gonadotrophins and continue through ovulation and estrus.  When progesterone levels reach certain levels they can signal the stage of estrus the female is.  Prediction of birth date of the pending litter can be very accurate if ovulation date is known.  Puppies deliver with a day or two of 9 weeks gestation in most cases.  It is not possible to determine pregnancy using progesterone tests once a breeding has taken place, however.  This is due to the fact that, in dogs, progesterone levels remain elevated throughout the estrus period.

References

External links
 Progesterone MS Spectrum
 
 

 
5α-Reductase inhibitors
11β-Hydroxysteroid dehydrogenase inhibitors
Alkene derivatives
Antimineralocorticoids
Diketones
GABAA receptor positive allosteric modulators
Glucocorticoids
Glycine receptor antagonists
Neurosteroids
Hepatotoxins
Hormones of the hypothalamus-pituitary-adrenal axis
Hormones of the hypothalamus-pituitary-gonad axis
Hormones of the hypothalamic-pituitary-prolactin axis
Hormones of the ovary
Hormones of the placenta
Hormones of the suprarenal cortex
Hormones of the brain
Hormones of the pregnant female
Human female endocrine system
Human hormones
Pregnane X receptor agonists
Pregnanes
Progestogens
Prolactin releasers
Sex hormones
Sigma antagonists
Steroid hormones
Total synthesis